The 1965 Australian One and a Half Litre Championship was a CAMS sanctioned national motor racing title for drivers of racing cars complying with the Australian 1½ Litre Formula. The title was contested over a single 20 lap race at the Mount Panorama Circuit, Bathurst, New South Wales on 19 April 1965. The race also included a class for under 1100cc Australian Formula 2 cars.

Results

References

Further reading 
 Sports Car World, June 1965, pages 52-53

Australian One and a Half Litre Championship
Motorsport in Bathurst, New South Wales
One